"Love Land" is a song written by Rose Marie McCoy and Luther Dixon. It was first recorded by Al Hibbler in 1958.

Charles Wright recording
Charles Wright and Don Trotter covered Al Hibbler's recording and performed by Charles Wright & the Watts 103rd Street Rhythm Band. It was released in 1970 on the Warner Bros label.  It reached #16 on the Billboard Hot 100 and #23 on the U.S. R&B chart.  The song was featured on their 1969 album, In the Jungle, Babe.

The song was produced by Wright. Lead vocals on the cut were performed by the band's drummer James Gadsen (who would later become an in-demand session drummer).

The single ranked #50 on Billboard's Year-End Hot 100 singles of 1970.

Chart positions

Other covers
It was later covered by Tower of Power on their, "Great American Soulbook" Lp, released in 2009.

References

1970 songs
1970 singles
Charles Wright & the Watts 103rd Street Rhythm Band songs
Warner Records singles
Songs written by Rose Marie McCoy
Songs written by Luther Dixon